This is a list of South African Test cricketers. The list is arranged in the order in which each player won his Test cap. Where more than one player won his first Test cap in the same Test match, those players are listed alphabetically by surname.

International Test teams wear their cap number on their uniform. For South African players, cap numbers worn on their uniform start from their readmission to Test cricket in 1991 following their cricket boycott during the apartheid era. This table includes sequential cap numbers from South Africa's first Test played in 1889, as well as cap numbers worn on uniforms' since South Africa's readmission. Note that post-readmission cap numbers are not based on alphabetical order.

Players

Statistics are correct as of 11 March 2023.

‡ Captain
† Wicketkeeper

See also
 Test cricket
 South Africa national cricket team
 List of South Africa national cricket captains
 List of South Africa ODI cricketers
 List of South Africa Twenty20 International cricketers

Notes

References

External links 
 Cricinfo
 Howstat

South Africa
Test cricketers